Dirac cones, named after Paul Dirac, are features that occur in some electronic band structures that describe unusual electron transport properties of materials like graphene and topological insulators. In these materials, at energies near the Fermi level, the valence band and conduction band take the shape of the upper and lower halves of a conical surface, meeting at what are called Dirac points.

Description
In quantum mechanics, Dirac cones are a kind of crossing-point which electrons avoid, where the energy of the valence and conduction bands are not equal anywhere in two dimensional lattice -space, except at the zero dimensional Dirac points. As a result of the cones, electrical conduction can be described by the movement of charge carriers which are massless fermions, a situation which is handled theoretically by the relativistic Dirac equation. The massless fermions lead to various quantum Hall effects, magnetoelectric effects in topological materials, and ultra high carrier mobility. Dirac cones were observed in 2008-2009, using angle-resolved photoemission spectroscopy (ARPES) on the potassium-graphite intercalation compound KC8. and on several bismuth-based alloys.

As an object with three dimensions, Dirac cones are a feature of two-dimensional materials or surface states, based on a linear dispersion relation between energy and the two components of the crystal momentum x and y. However, this concept can be extended to three dimensions, where Dirac semimetals are defined by a linear dispersion relation between energy and x, y, and z. In -space, this shows up as a hypercone, which have doubly degenerate bands which also meet at Dirac points. Dirac semimetals contain both time reversal and spatial inversion symmetry; when one of these is broken, the Dirac points are split into two constituent Weyl points, and the material becomes a Weyl semimetal. In 2014, direct observation of the Dirac semimetal band structure using ARPES was conducted on the Dirac semimetal cadmium arsenide.

Analog systems 
Dirac points have been realized in many physical areas such as plasmonics, phononics, or nanophotonics (microcavities, photonic crystals).

See also 
 Dirac matter

References

Further reading
 

 

 

 

 

 

Electronic band structures